DBP may refer to:

Medicine 
 DBP (gene), a gene coding for the D site of albumin promoter (albumin D-box) binding protein
 Deathbed phenomena
 Diastolic blood pressure, minimum blood pressure between two heartbeats
 Vitamin D-binding protein

Science and technology 
Dibutyl phthalate, a plasticizer
Digital back-propagation, a technique for compensating all fiber impairments in optical transmission systems
Disinfection by-product, a chemical occurring in water as a result of disinfection

Other 
Dave Benson Phillips, a British children's TV presenter
Democratic Regions Party,(), a political party in Turkey
Deutsche Bauernpartei, former German political party
Deutsche Bundespost, former German federal post office   
Development Bank of the Philippines
Dewan Bahasa dan Pustaka, a government body responsible for coordinating the use of the Malay language in Malaysia
Dewan Bahasa dan Pustaka Brunei, the official Malay-language regulator and public libraries operator in Brunei
Don Bosco Prep, all-boys Roman  Catholic school in Ramsey, New Jersey